Timothy Roger Costo (born February 16, 1969) is an American former Major League Baseball player.

Costo was a first round draft pick (8th overall) in the 1990 Amateur Draft.  He was drafted by the Cleveland Indians.  He had a nine-year minor League career, in the farm system for the Indians, the Cincinnati Reds, the St. Louis Cardinals, and the Toronto Blue Jays.  He lives in Chattanooga, Tennessee, where he is the head baseball coach at The McCallie School.

External links

1969 births
Living people
Cincinnati Reds players
Baseball players from Illinois
Major League Baseball outfielders
Major League Baseball first basemen
Iowa Hawkeyes baseball players
Kinston Indians players
Canton-Akron Indians players
Chattanooga Lookouts players
Buffalo Bisons (minor league) players
Indianapolis Indians players
Louisville Redbirds players
Syracuse SkyChiefs players
All-American college baseball players